Kraljeva Sutjeska (sometimes Kraljevska Sutjeska, or just Sutjeska or Sutiska, historically Trstivnica, in local tradition Naše stolno misto) is a village in the municipality of Kakanj, Bosnia and Herzegovina. The village has historical significance and rich heritage. During the Middle Ages it used to be a capital of medieval Bosnian state, and a place where the main court of the royal Bosnian Kotromanić dynasty was situated. The town was also called Trstivnica in official state charters of that time. It is situated at the foothills of Zvijezda mountain. A couple of kilometres above the Sutjeska, in northeastern direction in the mountain, the historic fortress-city of Bobovac was situated, which was also a secluded royal seat of the Bosnian kings.

History and heritage 
The village hosts a number of important historical sites:
 Ruins of the medieval Bosnian Court. The court in Trstionica (present-day Kraljeva Sutjeska) was established by Ban of Bosnia, Stjepan II Kotromanić. The compound consisted of several buildings, chapel, and the nucleus of what will later become Kraljeva Sutjeska Franciscan Monastery.
 A 14th century Catholic Franciscan monastery in Kraljeva Sutjeska
 Bobovac, the residency of the Bosnian kings during medieval times and the site of the mausoleum of the royals and remnants of the Kotromanić dynasty castle
 An old Bosnian house with the original architecture from the 18th century
 The Mehmed II Fatih mosque from the 15th century, claimed to be the oldest in Bosnia and Herzegovina

Demographics 

According to the 2013 census, its population was 248.

Notable people
 Dejan Lovren, Croatian footballer was raised here until he fled during the war.

 René Maric, Assistant Head Coach at Premier League side Leeds United. Ancestry from Kraljeva Sutjeska.

References

External links
Naše stolno mjesto
Friary Kraljeva Sutjeska

Populated places in Kakanj
Medieval Bosnian state
Medieval sites in Bosnia and Herzegovina

bs:Kraljeva Sutjeska (franjevački samostan)
de:Kraljeva Sutjeska (Franziskanerkloster)
hr:Franjevački samostan Kraljeva Sutjeska